The governor of Western Australia is the representative in Western Australia of the monarch of Australia, currently King Charles III. As with the other governors of the Australian states, the governor of Western Australia performs constitutional, ceremonial and community functions, including:

 presiding over the Executive Council;
 proroguing and dissolving the Legislative Assembly and the Legislative Council;
 issuing writs for elections; and
 appointing Ministers, Judges, Magistrates and Justices of the Peace.

Furthermore, all bills passed by the Parliament of Western Australia require the governor's signature before they become acts and pass into law. However, since convention almost always requires the governor to act on the advice of the premier and the cabinet, such approval is almost always a formality.

Until the appointment of Sir James Mitchell in 1948, all governors of Western Australia had been British officials. After Mitchell's appointment, a further three Britons served as governor: Mitchell's two immediate successors, and then, from 1980 to 1983, Rear-Admiral Sir Richard Trowbridge who was the last British governor of any Australian state.

Styles
The governor of Western Australia is styled "His Excellency"  during his term in office (or Her Excellency for a female governor). In August 2014, three of the four living past governors – John Sanderson, Ken Michael and Malcolm McCusker – were given the style "The Honourable", on the recommendation of the premier. The other living former governor, Michael Jeffery, already held the style in virtue of his later service as governor-general of Australia.

Governor's standard
The governor's standard of Western Australia is the same design as the British blue ensign with the union flag at the upper left quarter. On the right side, the state badge of Western Australia, comprising a black swan in a yellow disc, is surmounted by the St. Edward's crown.
 
If the standard is flying at Government House, on a vehicle or at an event, this indicates that the governor is present.

List of lieutenant-governors of the Swan River Colony and governors of Western Australia
This is a list of governors and lieutenant-governors of Western Australia.

Lieutenant-governors of the Swan River Colony
Stirling was in fact only commissioned as the governor of Western Australia from 4 March 1831, rectifying the absence of a legal instrument providing the authority detailed in Stirling's Instructions of 30 December 1828. Stirling had said of his own position: I believe I am the first Governor who ever formed a settlement without Commission, Laws, Instructions and Salary.

Governors

References

External links

 Government House, Western Australia: The Official Website of the Governor of Western Australia

Western Australia
Parliament of Western Australia
Western Australia-related lists